The Wanggumara, also spelt Wangkumara, Wongkumara, Wangkumarra, and other variants, are an Aboriginal people of the state of Queensland, Australia.

Language
Old Wankumara, spoken along the Bulloo River with the Kalali people, was a 'Karna–Mari fringe' language which died out with the passing of its last speakers in the late 20th century. 'Modern' Wankumara, spoken along the Wilson River, is a Karnic language, which according to Breen (1967) was identical to the speech of other peoples speaking the Wilson River language. The disambiguator 'modern' simply refers to the fact that the Wanggumara people continued speaking that language more recently than the other.

Country

Writing in 1886, F. W. Myles described their neighbouring tribes as follows:
The names of the tribes  which adjoin the Wonkomarra are, to the south, the Poidgerry (on the Currowinya Downs station) and the Bitharra (on the Bulloo Downs station); to the west, the Thiralla (on the Nockatoongo station) and Eromarra (on the Conbar station); to the north, the Bunthomarra (on the Mount Margaret station) and the Murgoin (on the Ardock station); and on the east by the same tribe (on the Dynevor station).

History of contact
The first settlers arrived in 1863, and within two decades their population had been reduced substantially to just 90 people. Those surviving moved to Chastleton and NCarcowlah where they mingled with the Kalali.

Social organisation
The Wanggumara were divided into hordes, concerning which two names possibly referring to their clans survive:
 Balpamadramadra (perhaps a clan at Nappa Merrie)
 Jaramarala (perhaps a clan at Baryulah).

Alternative names
 Wangkumara, Wonkamara, Wonkomarra, Wonkamarra, Wonkamura, Wonkamurra
 Wonkubara, Wanggumara
 Papagunu (derogatory Yandruwandha exonym name, signifying "dog shit")
 Balpamadramadra
 Jaramarala

Some words
 mari. (dog, whether wild or tame)
 wanyu. (father)
 unu. (mother)
 doona. (whiteman, meaning properly "ghost").

Notes

Citations

Sources

Aboriginal peoples of Queensland